Björn Isfält (28 June 1942 – 17 January 1997) was a Swedish composer. At the 25th Guldbagge Awards he won the Creative Achievement award. He composed music for more than 35 films and television shows between 1970 and 1995.

Selected filmography
 A Swedish Love Story (1970)
 Giliap (1975)
 The Brothers Lionheart (1977)
 Göta kanal eller Vem drog ur proppen? (1981)
 Rasmus på luffen (1981)
 Killing Heat (1981)
 Ronia, the Robber's Daughter (1984)
 My Life as a Dog (1985)
 Allra käraste syster (1988)
 Ingen rövare finns i skogen (1988)
 The Journey to Melonia (1989)
 World of Glory (1991)
 What's Eating Gilbert Grape (1993)

References

External links

1942 births
1997 deaths
Swedish film score composers
Male film score composers
People from Linköping
20th-century classical musicians
20th-century composers
20th-century Swedish male musicians
20th-century Swedish musicians